Seo Yeongsuhap (서영수합, 徐令壽閤; 1753–1823) was a Korean poet.

Biography 
Seo Yeongsuhap was born into a high-ranking family, the Dalseong Seo clan (달성 서씨, 達城 徐氏), as the daughter of the governor of Gangwon Province, Seo Hyeong-su.

She was reportedly known for her abilities in mathematics. She published hundreds of poems in an anthology, and included an appendix to her husband's memoir. In the Korean society of her time, women were not supposed to have any official role, and she was one of very few women published during the Joseon dynasty. Alongside Yi Bingheogak, she is mentioned as one of two female scholars to make a name for themselves within practical learning.

She was later arranged to marry Hong In-mo of the Pungsan Hong clan, a royal official. All four became poets as well, and Gil-ju under the influence of his mother also became a notable mathematician. Her third son, Hong Hyeon-ju, married Princess Sukseon, the only daughter of King Jeongjo of Joseon, who is herself known for inventing Kkakdugi, i.e. the diced radish kimchi.

Family 
 Father - Seo Hyeong-su (서형수)
 Husband - Hong In-mo (홍인모, 洪仁謨) (1755 – 1812)
 Father-in-law - Hong Nak-seong (홍낙성, 洪樂性) (1718 - 1798)
 Mother-in-law - Lady Sim of the Cheongsong Sim clan (청송 심씨, 靑松 沈氏)
 Children
 Son - Hong Seok-ju (홍석주, 洪奭周) (1774 - 1842)
 Daughter - Hong Won-ju (홍원주, 洪原周), Yuhandang (유한당) (1783 - ?)
 Son - Hong Gil-ju (홍길주, 洪吉周) (1786 - 1841)
 Son - Hong Hyeon-ju (홍현주, 洪顯周), Lord Yeongmyeong (영명위, 永明尉) (1793 - 1865)
 Daughter-in-law - Princess Sukseon (숙선옹주) (11 April 1793 – 7 June 1836)
 Grandson - Hong Woo-cheol (홍우철, 洪祐喆) (1813 – 1853)
 Granddaughter-in-law - Lady Yi of the Jeonju Yi clan (전주 이씨, 全州 李氏) (1815 - 1868)
 Great-Grandson - Hong Seung-gan (홍승간, 洪承幹) (1834 – 1845)
 Great-Grandson - Hong Seung-eok (홍승억, 洪承億) (1842 – 1882)

References

1753 births
1823 deaths
Korean women poets
18th-century Korean women writers
18th-century Korean poets
19th-century Korean women writers
19th-century Korean poets